Joachim Karsch (June 20, 1897 – February 11, 1945) was a German artist. He was born in Breslau and died in Groß Gandern, Sternberg. In 1932, he won a bronze medal in the art competitions at the Los Angeles Games for his Stabwechsel ("Baton passing").

He committed suicide during World War II, instead of being taken to a Russian prisoner of war camp.

References

External links
 
 Karsch on artnet

1897 births
1945 suicides
German artists
Olympic bronze medalists in art competitions
Medalists at the 1932 Summer Olympics
Suicides in Germany
Olympic competitors in art competitions
German civilians killed in World War II
1945 deaths